Naxibacter varians is a Gram negative, nonmotile rod-shaped, non-spore-forming, and oxidase positive bacterium from the Oxalobacteraceae family, which was isolated from clinical specimens and water samples.

Etymology
Its specific name comes from the Latin varians because biochemical tests have shown variable results.

References

Burkholderiales
Bacteria described in 2008